Kamini Jindal (born 16 June 1988) is an Indian politician and was a member of the  Legislative Assembly representing Sri Ganganagar in Rajasthan.

She is the daughter of B.D. Aggarwal, founder of the National Unionist Zamindara Party, and wife of Dr. Gagandeep Singla an IPS officer in Rajasthan. Kamini Jindal actively supported Aam Admi Party in Delhi election by getting advertisements published in leading newspapers.

Kamini Jindal has been an Executive Director of Vikas WSP Limited since 16 July 2012.

References

External links
 http://rajassembly.nic.in/MembersPage.asp?DivNo=26
 https://www.bloomberg.com/research/stocks/people/person.asp?personId=214294310&capId=20413041

Rajasthani politicians
1988 births
Living people
Rajasthan MLAs 2013–2018